Munder may refer to:

 Munder, Suriname, a resort (municipality)
 Munder, Udupi, Karnataka, India, a village
 Bad Münder, Lower Saxony, Germany, a town
 Eugen Munder (1899–1952), Nazi official